Your Heart Is My Homeland (German: Dein Herz ist meine Heimat) is a 1953 Austrian-West German drama film directed by Richard Häussler and starring Inge Egger, Erwin Strahl and Viktor Staal. It is also known as Magdalena Percht after the lead character. It is part of the trend of post-war heimatfilm. 
It was shot at the Bavaria Studios in Munich and on location in Salzburg.

The script was written by Metropolis screenwriter Thea von Harbou. The project had originally been planned in 1947 to be directed by Eduard von Borsody as a comeback vehicle for the actor Attila Hörbiger.

Cast
 Inge Egger as Magdalena Percht  
 Erwin Strahl as Andreas Möbius  
 Viktor Staal as Christian Möbius  
 Elisabeth Markus as Magdalenas Mutter  
 Heinrich Gretler as Bürgermeister Percht  
 Albert Florath as Lehrer  
 Walter Janssen as Pfarrer  
 Bum Krüger as Wirt  
 Melanie Horeschowsky as Frau Heftel  
 Alfred Menhardt 
 Eva Orler 
 Anton Gaugl 
 Gustav Waldau 
 Kurt von Lessen

References

Bibliography 
 Fritsche, Maria. Homemade Men in Postwar Austrian Cinema: Nationhood, Genre and Masculinity. Berghahn Books, 2013.
 Von Dassanowsky, Robert. Austrian Cinema: A History. McFarland, 2005.

External links 
 

1953 films
1953 drama films
Austrian drama films
German drama films
West German films
1950s German-language films
Films directed by Richard Häussler
Films based on Austrian novels
Films about rape
Austrian black-and-white films
German black-and-white films
1950s German films
Films shot at Bavaria Studios